Rolf Hartung (born 20 July 1947) is a German rower who represented West Germany.

He competed at the 1968 Summer Olympics in Mexico City with the men's coxed pair where they came sixth. At the 1969 European Rowing Championships in Klagenfurt, he won bronze with the men's eight.

References

1947 births
Living people
German male rowers
Olympic rowers of West Germany
Rowers at the 1968 Summer Olympics
Sportspeople from Hanau
European Rowing Championships medalists